Philip of Austria may refer to either of two Habsburg kings in Spain, whose family originated in Austria:

 Philip I of Castile